She's the Boss is the debut solo album by English singer Mick Jagger, released in 1985.

When Jagger's group The Rolling Stones signed with Columbia/CBS Records in 1983, one of the options available to them was for individual projects, and Jagger eagerly began working on She's the Boss.

Background
Following the release of the Stones' 1983 album Undercover, Jagger began composing material for his first solo project. He obtained the help of various musician friends in the studio when recording began in May 1984. Contributors included Pete Townshend, Jeff Beck, Carlos Alomar, Herbie Hancock, Sly and Robbie and the Bahamas-based musicians known as Compass Point Allstars. Jagger would share production duties with Bill Laswell and Nile Rodgers.

Keith Richards, Jagger's longtime musical partner in the Rolling Stones, was not pleased that Jagger was pursuing solo work, feeling that their band should be both their first priority; Richards was especially upset because in 1983, Jagger had piggy-backed a three album solo deal with Columbia on the multi-million Stones deal without informing any of the other Stones. The increasing animosity between both musicians would publicly erupt in 1986 before they resolved their differences a few years later. In his 2010 memoir Life, Richards compared She's the Boss to Mein Kampf: "Everybody had a copy, but nobody listened to it."

She's the Boss was released in February 1985 – preceded by its lead song "Just Another Night". Both the album and its first single became worldwide hits, with "Just Another Night" reaching No. 1 on the US Mainstream Rock chart and No. 12 on the US pop chart, and She's the Boss going to No. 6 in the UK and No. 13 in the US, where it went platinum.

The follow-up single "Lucky in Love" would be a Top 40 US hit. The single version (which was also released on video) has been remixed considerably from the album version. The single version is 4:51 long.

The version of "Hard Woman" released as a single (with an accompanying video) is radically different from the album version.  The single is titled "Hard Woman (New Version)".  The video for "Hard Woman" extensively utilised a Cray X-MP supercomputer for its animation, making it one of the most expensive music videos made to that point in time. "Lonely at the Top" was recorded by the Rolling Stones in 1979 with altered lyrics and 
a less uplifting sound.

The success of the album – impacted by Jagger's solo appearance at Live Aid that July and his rush-recorded duet hit cover of "Dancing in the Street" with David Bowie — influenced Jagger to record a successor, Primitive Cool, which would be released in 1987.

Although originally released by Columbia, She's the Boss was acquired and reissued by Atlantic Records in 1993, following the release of Jagger's third album, Wandering Spirit, also issued by Atlantic.

In 1986, Jamaican reggae singer Patrick Alley attempted to sue Jagger over the song "Just Another Night," which Alley claims he had recorded in 1979 and released on his 1982 album, A Touch of Patrick Alley. Alley claimed that Sly Dunbar (who played drums on She's the Boss) also played on his recording. The case was cleared in 1988, with Jagger stating "My reputation is really cleared. If you're well known, people stand up and take shots at you."

Track listing

Personnel

Musicians
Mick Jagger – vocals, backing vocals, harmonica
Wally Badarou – synthesizer on "Lucky in Love" and "She's the Boss"
Jeff Beck – lead guitar on "Lonely at the Top", "Running Out of Luck", "Hard Woman", "Just Another Night" and "She's the Boss"; guitar on "Lucky in Love"; acoustic guitar on "Just Another Night"
Paul Buckmaster – strings arrangement and conductor on "Hard Woman"
John Bundrick – synthesizer on "Just Another Night"
Ray Cooper – percussion on "Lucky in Love", congas on "She's the Boss"
Aïyb Dieng – shaker on "Just Another Night", water drums on "Lucky in Love"
Sly Dunbar – drums on "Running Out of Luck", "Just Another Night", "Lucky in Love" and "She's the Boss"
Bernard Edwards – bass guitar on "1/2 a Loaf", "Turn the Girl Loose" and "Secrets"
Steve Ferrone – drums on "1/2 a Loaf"
Anton Fier – programming, electronic drums on "Just Another Night", percussion on "She's the Boss"
Anton Fig – drums on "Turn the Girl Loose" and "Secrets"
Guy Fletcher – synthesizer on "Lonely at the Top", "Lucky in Love" and "She's the Boss"
Bernard Fowler – backing vocals on "Lonely at the Top", "Lucky in Love" and "She's the Boss"
Jan Hammer – piano on "Hard Woman"
Herbie Hancock – Hammond organ on "Lonely at the Top", synthesizer on "Running Out of Luck", "Turn the Girl Loose" and "Lucky in Love"
Colin Hodgkinson – bass guitar on "Hard Woman"
Bill Laswell – bass guitar, synthesizer on "Just Another Night"
Chuck Leavell – Hammond organ on "Lucky in Love" and "She's the Boss"
Ron Magness – synthesizer on "Just Another Night"
Eddie Martinez – lead guitar on "1/2 a Loaf", guitar on "Lonely at the Top", "Running Out of Luck" and "She's the Boss"
Alfa Anderson – ladies rap on "Turn the Girl Loose"
Lenny Pickett – baritone saxophone on "Turn the Girl Loose"
Daniel Ponce – bata drum on "Running Out of Luck"
Nile Rodgers – guitar on "1/2 a Loaf" and "Secrets"
Robert Sabino – keyboards, piano, synthesizer on "1/2 a Loaf" and "Secrets"
Robbie Shakespeare – bass guitar on "Running Out of Luck", "Just Another Night", "Lucky in Love" and "She's the Boss"
Michael Shrieve – drums on "Lonely at the Top"
G. E. Smith – lead guitar on "Secrets"
Tony Thompson – drums on "Hard Woman"
Fonzi Thornton – backing vocals on "1/2 a Loaf"
Pete Townshend – guitar on "Lonely at the Top", acoustic guitar on "Hard Woman"

Production
Mick Jagger – producer
Bill Laswell/Material – producer
Nile Rodgers – producer on "1/2 a Loaf", "Turn the Girl Loose" and "Secrets"
James Farber – engineer
Dave Jerden – engineer
Bill Scheniman – engineer
Peter Corriston – art direction, design
Erica Lennard – photography

Charts

Weekly charts

Year-end charts

Certifications

References

1985 debut albums
Albums produced by Bill Laswell
Albums produced by Mick Jagger
Albums produced by Nile Rodgers
Atlantic Records albums
Columbia Records albums
Mick Jagger albums
Albums arranged by Paul Buckmaster